Montgomery Lake is a lake in Florence County, Wisconsin. There are panfish, largemouth bass and trout in the lake.

References

Lakes of Florence County, Wisconsin